At the 1992 Summer Olympics in Barcelona, 43 events in athletics were contested, 24 events by men and 19 by women. The competition ran from July 31, 1992, to August 9, 1992. Fourteen world record-holders (eight men and six women) were among the contenders. Thirty former Olympic champions competed, and a total number of 1725 athletes from 156 countries.

Medal summary

Men

* Athletes who participated in the heats only and received medals.

Women

* Athletes who participated in the heats only and received medals.

Medal table

Participating nations
A total of 156 nations participated in the different Athletics events at the 1992 Summer Olympics.

See also
1992 in athletics (track and field)

References

External links
 Athletics Australia

 
1992 Summer Olympics events
Olympics
1992
1992 Olympics
1992 Olympics
1992 Olympics